Tocquigny (est. 1980) is an advertising and marketing consultancy in the United States. The full-service agency was sold in June 2015 and now operates as the Yvonne Tocquigny Branding Group.

History 
Founded in 1980 as a design studio by Yvonne Tocquigny, the business grew into a full-service ad agency recognized primarily for its business-to-business and digital work.  Dell was one of the first blue chip companies to work with Tocquigny, starting in the early 1990s.  In 2015 the full-service Tocquigny agency was acquired by Memphis-based Archer Malmo. In 2016 Tocquigny was reimagined as the virtual agency Yvonne Tocquigny Branding Group.

Clients 
Past and present client roster includes:
 Accruent
 Applied Materials
 Caterpillar Inc.
 Dell
 Ergon, Inc. 
 G2-Ops, Inc. 
 InfoSnap
 Jeep
 LegacyTexas Bank
 NFP Advisor Services Group
 Qualico
 Regent University
 Teradata
 Tory Burch
 World Vision International
 World's Finest Chocolate

SXSW Involvement
At SXSW 2014 and 2015, Tocquigny hosted the “Tocquigny Taco Tour." Wrapping a bus and mounting a giant taco on the front, Tocquigny shuttled SXSW attendees from downtown Austin to various local taco shops during the festival. The design work for the Taco Tour was awarded a HOW Magazine 2014 Promotion & Marketing Design Award and a 2014 Print Regional Design Annual Award.

External links
Official website of the Yvonne Tocquigny Branding Group
Yvonne Tocquigny's Capital Factory mentor profile

References

Advertising agencies of the United States
1980 establishments in Texas